Bob Clearmountain (born January 15, 1953) is an American recording engineer, mixer and record producer. He has worked with many major acts, including Bruce Springsteen, the Rolling Stones, Toto, Bon Jovi and Bryan Adams, with whom he has a very long association. He has been nominated for four Grammy Awards and won a Latin Grammy Award in 2007 for Best Male Pop Vocal Album for his work with engineering Ricky Martin's "MTV Unplugged". He has also won an Emmy and he has won seven TEC Awards for "Best Recording Engineer", two others for "Best Broadcast Engineer", one special "Les Paul Award" and a Monitor Award for the Rolling Stones' Voodoo Lounge pay-per-view show. He is married to Apogee Electronics CEO, Betty Bennett.

Biography 
As a teenager, Clearmountain had many friends who were musicians or aspirants. He loved music, and played bass guitar in a bar band, but felt he did not want to rely on these capricious beings for his career. Always more interested in the technical side, Clearmountain had a makeshift studio at home equipped with a two-track reel-to-reel tape recorder, some microphones and a talkback. He also loved to make tape recordings of the band's concerts. According to an interview with Sound on Sound, Clearmountain was immediately attracted when he entered a professional recording studio for the first time.

His band had been making a demo recording at Mediasound Studios on 57th Street in New York. Determined to make a career in the technical side of the music business, he visited frequently and pestered the studio for a job. He was eventually hired as a gofer. Clearmountain claims that after making about two deliveries, he found staff at the office had been looking for him – they had apparently been expecting him to be working on a recording session, as an assistant engineer. The star-struck new assistant engineer found that his first session was with Duke Ellington.

According to Clearmountain, he was hired as Chief Engineer at the Power Station (now Avatar Studios) as they were opening in around 1977, and had a say in designing the recording studios and choosing the equipment as a rock music studio.

Clearmountain also played bass on the Dead Boys' first album, Young, Loud and Snotty, before Jeff Magnum rejoined the group.

On September 3rd, 2022, Clearmountain recorded and mixed the live broadcast of the Foo Fighters Taylor Hawkins Tribute concert from Wembley Stadium. On September 27th, he recorded the Taylor Hawkins tribute concert at the Los Angeles Forum.

As Mixer/Producer 
Clearmountain has worked with many of the biggest names in music, having, for example, mixed Springsteen's Born in the U.S.A., The Rolling Stones' Tattoo You, and having produced or mixed extensively for Bryan Adams since 1981. He cites works he is most proud of are Aimee Mann's first solo album, Whatever; albums by Australian band Crowded House, Play by Squeeze and Avalon by Roxy Music (1982). He also mixed David Bowie's 1983 album Let's Dance.

Live at El Mocambo boxed set 2022 remix
He has been nominated for four Grammy Awards and won a Latin Grammy Award in 2007 for Best Male Pop Vocal Album for his work with engineering "MTV Unplugged" for Ricky Martin. He has also won an Emmy and he has won seven TEC Awards for "Best Recording Engineer", two others for "Best Broadcast Engineer", one special "Les Paul Award" and a Monitor Award for the Rolling Stone's Voodoo Lounge pay-per-view show.

Selection of work as Live Mixer/Engineer 

 Live Aid - July 13th 1985 - John F. Kennedy Stadium Philadelphia, Pennsylvania 
 Nelson Mandela 70th Birthday Tribute Concert - June 11th, 1988 - Wembley Stadium London, UK
 The Who - Tommy - August 24th 1989 - Universal Amphitheater, Los Angeles, California
 A Tribute to John Lennon - May 5th 1990 on the Pier Head, Liverpool
 Woodstock 94 - August 12-14, 1994 - Winston Farm, Saugerties New York
 Rock & Roll Hall of Fame Induction Ceremony - March 15th, 1999 - Waldorf-Astoria Hotel, New York City
 The Concert for New York City - October 20, 2001 - Madison Square Garden, New York City
 12-12-12: The Concert for Sandy Relief - December 12th, 2012 Madison Square Garden - New York City, New York City
 Foo Fighters Taylor Hawkins Tribute Concert - September 3, 2022 - Wembley Stadium London, UK
 Foo Fighters Taylor Hawkins Tribute Concert - September 27, 2022 - Kia Forum Los Angeles, California
 Rock & Roll Hall of Fame Induction Ceremony - November 5, 2022 - Microsoft Theater in Los Angeles, California

Selection of his work as a Producer 

Bryan Adams' You Want It You Got It, Cuts Like a Knife, Reckless and Into the Fire albums
Jonatha Brooke's Steady Pull and Careful What You Wish For albums
The Church's 1982 album The Blurred Crusade
David Bowie's 1983 album Let's Dance
Hall & Oates' 1984 album Big Bam Boom
Paul McCartney's Tripping the Live Fantastic album
The Pretenders' Get Close album
Simple Minds' Once Upon a Time album
The Who's Join Together album
Michael Stanley Band's 1983 You Can't Fight Fashion album
The album documenting the Woodstock '94 concert in Saugerties, NY
The Silencers' Rock 'N' Roll Enforcers album (1980)
Crowded House:temple of the low men album (1988)

References

External links
 Bob Clearmountain's homepage
 "Bob Clearmountain: Master Mixer" Sound on Sound
 Bob Clearmountain Interview - NAMM Oral History Library (2016)

1953 births
Living people
Record producers from Connecticut
Grammy Award winners
Latin Grammy Award winners
Emmy Award winners
American audio engineers
Mixing engineers